Henri Renaud (20 April 1925, in Villedieu-sur-Indre, France – 17 October 2002, in Paris) was a French jazz pianist, record producer, and record company executive.

His styles reflected the decades when he was musically active: he played in the swing, bebop, and cool styles. He developed a reputation internationally when he served as an ensemble-organizing point-man for visiting jazz performers from the United States.

Renaud moved to Paris in 1946 and established a career as a jazz pianist. He joined tenor-saxophonist Jean-Claude Fohrenbach's combo. During 1949 and 1950, he accompanied Don Byas, James Moody, and Roy Eldridge. In 1952, he performed with Lester Young, Sarah Vaughan, and Clifford Brown. Brown made several recordings with Renaud. In 1954, Renaud visited the United States, where he recorded. He made recordings with Milt Jackson, J. J. Johnson, Al Cohn, Oscar Pettiford, Max Roach, Frank Foster, and Bob Brookmeyer.

Upon becoming an executive for French CBS' jazz division in 1964, he largely stopped his activity as a professional jazz pianist, but did occasional work as a film composer.

Discography

As leader 
 Henri Renaud et Son Orchestre (Duretet Thomson, 1957)
 Dance and Mood Music Vol. 8 (Chappell, 1969)
 Blue Cylinder (PSI, 1970)
 Jeu De L'oie with Georges Arvanitas, Andre Ceccarelli (Arion, 1971)
 New Sound at the Boeuf Sur Le Toit (Fresh Sound, 1987)
 Complete Legendary Saturne Picture Discs (Paris Jazz Corner, 2001)

As sideman
 Gigi Gryce et son Orchestre (Vogue, 1953)
 Clifford Brown: Clifford Brown Quartet (Vogue, 1953)
 Clifford Brown: Quartet in Paris / Sextet in Paris (OJC, 1953)
 Jay Cameron: The Third Herdsman - The Vogue Sessions (Vogue, 1955)
 Al Cohn: The Birdlanders Vol.1 and Vol.2  (OJC, 1954)
 Bobby Jaspar: Bobby Jaspar/Henri Renaud (Vogue 1953-54) with Jimmy Gourley, Fats Sadi
 Lee Konitz: Lee Konitz Plays (Disques Vogue, 1953)
 Oscar Pettiford: Oscar Pettiford Sextet (Disques Vogue, 1954)
 Zoot Sims: Quartet & Sextet (Vogue, 1953)
 Lucky Thompson: Jazz in Paris - Modern Jazz Group (Emarcy, 1956)

See also
Clifford Brown
French jazz

References

External links

1925 births
2002 deaths
French jazz pianists
French male pianists
People from Indre
20th-century French pianists
20th-century French male pianists
French male jazz musicians
French record producers